David Gleeson (born 2 February 1978) is a professional golfer from Australia currently playing on the Asian Tour, where he has three victories.

Amateur career
Gleeson was born in Queensland and played amateur golf with notable golfers Adam Scott, Geoff Ogilvy and Brett Rumford. He had his biggest amateur win at the 1996 Australian Amateur. He was also a part of the winning team at the 1996 Eisenhower Trophy. He turned professional in 1998.

Professional career
Gleeson joined the Asian Tour in 1999 but did not find immediate success, picking up only three top-10s in his first three seasons.

After not finding success early on in Asia, Gleeson decided to attempt to play golf in Australia. He was medalist at the qualifying school in 2001 and picked up his best finish of the year at the Australian PGA Championship, where he finished 9th.

Gleeson's breakthrough year was 2002, where he picked up his first professional win on the Asian Tour at the Volvo China Open, where he led from start to finish. But immediately after his first win, he had a dip in performance.

Gleeson said mainly that his poor form was due to him tinkering with his swing and changing equipment frequently. He had only one top-10 in 2003 and did not record a top-10 in 2004 or 2005. He recorded two top-10s in 2006 with a runner-up finish. His 2007 season included three top-10s and he got his full playing status back.

The second Asian Tour win for Gleeson came in 2008 at the Macau Open. He finished 2008 as his most successful season on the Asian Tour, earning almost $500,000 and a 5th-place finish on the Order of Merit. Gleeson credits his return to form to fatherhood, saying he has less time now to tinker with his swing.

Amateur wins
1996 Australian Amateur
1998 New South Wales Medal (tied with Mark Thomson and Graydon Woolridge)

Professional wins (4)

Asian Tour wins (3)

Asian Tour playoff record (0–2)

PGT Asia wins (1)

Results in major championships

CUT = missed the halfway cut
Note: Gleeson only played in The Open Championship.

Results in World Golf Championships

Team appearances
Amateur
Eisenhower Trophy (representing Australia): 1996 (winners)
Nomura Cup (representing Australia): 1997
Australian Men's Interstate Teams Matches (representing Queensland): 1995, 1996, 1997, 1998

References

External links

Australian male golfers
Asian Tour golfers
PGA Tour of Australasia golfers
People from the Darling Downs
1978 births
Living people